Khlong Suan Phlu is a tambon (subdistrict) in Phra Nakhon Si Ayutthaya District, Phra Nakhon Si Ayutthaya Province.

History & toponymy
Its name "Khlong Suan Phlu" (literally means "betel plantation canal"), called after a khlong (canal) in the same name that crosses in the northwest part of the area. Khlong Suan Phlu is the old course of the Pa Sak River that begins at Hua Ro, and then turned towards the Hantra River and then pass Wat Phanan Choeng, where it is referred to as the "Khlong Suan Phlu". It is a waterway connects the Pa Sak and the Chao Phraya Rivers.

In the Ayutthaya period, a large number of waterways and ditches were dug. Khlong Suan Phlu (otherwise known as Khlong Phai Ling or Nam Mae Bia) was one of them.
Historically, Khlong Suan Phlu area was a large Chinese community. The Chao Phraya River near the canal mouth, it was the location of the houseboats of the Chinese immigrants. This area was believed to be the another mooring point for Chinese junk in the heart of Ayutthaya. Nowadays, the only surviving evidence that it used to be a Chinatown is a Chinese waterfront shrine that is more than 600 years old.

Geography
Khlong Suan Phlu covers 6.68 square kilometers (2.58 sq mi). The area is a suburb Ayutthaya and quasi-rural.

Its terrain is a floodplain, therefore suitable for farming.

It is bordered by Kamang and Phai Ling Subdistricts in its district to the north, Khan Ham Subdistrict in Uthai District to the east, Ko Rian Subdistrict in its district and Ban Krot Subdistrict in Bang Pa-in District to the south, and Ko Rian Subdistrict in its district to the west.

Administration
Khlong Suan Phlu is administered by two local government bodies: Phra Nakhon Si Ayutthaya City Municipality and Ayothaya Town Municipality.

It is also subdivided into three muban (village)

Economy
Khlong Suan Phlu is famous for hotels and resorts offer spa and Thai massage services for guests or the general public.

Places of interest

Place of worship
Wat Yai Chai Mongkhon

Shopping malls
Central Ayutthaya
Ayutthaya City Park

Transportation
Highway 32 (often colloquially known as Asian Highway) is a main thoroughfare.

Products
Roti sai mai
Artificial flowers
Wood carving product

Notes

References

Tambon of Phra Nakhon Si Ayutthaya Province